James "Jim" Schmidt (born July 28, 1950) is an American politician. He has served as a Republican member for the 31st district in the North Dakota House of Representatives  since 2013.

He lost his bid for reelection on June 14, 2022.

References

1950 births
Living people
People from Towner County, North Dakota
Businesspeople from North Dakota
Farmers from North Dakota
Republican Party members of the North Dakota House of Representatives
21st-century American politicians